The Cotton Club is a 1984 American crime drama film co-written and directed by Francis Ford Coppola and based on James Haskins' 1977 book of the same name. The story centers on the Cotton Club, a Harlem jazz club in the 1930s. The film stars Richard Gere, Gregory Hines, Diane Lane and Lonette McKee, with Bob Hoskins, James Remar, Nicolas Cage, Allen Garfield, Gwen Verdon, Fred Gwynne and Laurence Fishburne in supporting roles.

The film was noted for its over-budget production costs, and took a total of five years to make. Despite being a disappointment at the box-office, the film received generally positive reviews and was nominated for several awards, including Golden Globes for Best Director and Best Picture (Drama) and Oscars for Best Art Direction (Richard Sylbert, George Gaines) and Best Film Editing.

Plot
A musician named Dixie Dwyer begins working with mobsters to advance his career but falls in love with Vera Cicero, the girlfriend of Jewish-American organized crime kingpin Dutch Schultz.

A dancer from Dixie's neighborhood, Sandman Williams, is hired with his brother by The Cotton Club, a jazz club where most of the performers are black and the customers are white. Owney Madden, the boss of the Hell's Kitchen Irish mob, owns the club and runs it with his right-hand man, Frenchy DeMange.

Dixie becomes a Hollywood film star, thanks to the help of Madden and the mob but angering Schultz. He also continues to see Schultz's gun moll, Vera Cicero, whose new nightclub has been financed by the jealous gangster.

In the meantime, Dixie's ambitious younger brother Vincent becomes an enforcer for Schultz's crew and eventually a public enemy, holding Frenchy as a hostage.

Sandman alienates his brother Clay at The Cotton Club by agreeing to perform a solo number there. While the club's management interferes with Sandman's romantic interest in Lila, a singer, its cruel treatment of the performers leads to an intervention by Harlem criminal 'Bumpy' Rhodes on their behalf.

Dutch Schultz is violently dealt with by Madden's men while Dixie and Sandman perform on The Cotton Club's stage.

Cast

Production
Inspired to make The Cotton Club by a picture-book history of the nightclub by James Haskins, Robert Evans was the film's original producer. Evans hoped the film would bring public attention to African-American history in a similar way that Gone with the Wind did for the American Civil War and the Reconstruction era. On December 12, 1980, it was announced that Evans and Paramount Pictures would serve as co-producers of the film while Robert Altman would direct and Mario Puzo would write. However, Evans and Altman's film Popeye premiering that day became a box-office flop. Although Evans secured $12 million worth of financing from Saudi arms dealer Adnan Khashoggi, Paramount Pictures withdrew from the film in 1981. Evans worked to secure sole ownership of the film negative to recoup his losses from recent poor stock-market investments and a cocaine trafficking arrest. However, this action alienated potential investors who would be unable to profit from television and home video distribution rights. The production was finally delayed when Evans reached a plea bargain to produce an advertising campaign of anti-drug public service announcements in exchange for an expungement of his record.

In 1984 Evans, who intended to direct the film himself after Altman departed, hired William Kennedy and Francis Ford Coppola to re-write Mario Puzo's story and screenplay. Evans eventually decided that he did not want to direct the film and asked Coppola at the last minute. Evans and Coppola had an adversarial relationship from the production of the Godfather films but Coppola accepted the jobs as screenwriter and then director because he needed the money – he was deeply in debt from making One from the Heart with his own money and his studio Zoetrope Studios went bankrupt.  Richard Sylbert said that he told Evans not to hire Coppola because "he resents being in the commercial, narrative, Hollywood movie business". Coppola said that he had letters from Sylbert asking him to work on the film because Evans was crazy. Coppola also said that "Evans set the tone for the level of extravagance long before I got there".

By the time Evans decided not to direct and brought in Coppola, at least $13 million had already been committed.  Las Vegas casino owners Edward and Fred Doumani put $30 million into the film in exchange for a fifty-percent ownership stake in the film. Evans received further loans by mortgaging his mansion in Beverly Hills and stock in Gulf + Western as collateral. Other financial backers included Arab arms dealer Adnan Khashoggi, and vaudeville promoter Roy Radin, who was murdered in May 1983. The killers later alleged that they had been hired by Evans and Radin's girlfriend Karen Greenberger, a drug dealer who felt she was cut out of profits from the film. In the 1989 "Cotton Club Trial" Evans invoked his Fifth Amendment right against self-incrimination and refused to testify.

According to William Kennedy in an interview with Vanity Fair, the budget of the film was $47 million. However, Coppola told the head of Gaumont Film Company, Europe's largest distribution and production company, that he thought the film might cost $65 million.

Evans cast Al Pacino, Sylvester Stallone, and Harrison Ford to portray Dixie Dwyer before Gere was hired. Richard Pryor was considered for the role of Sandman Williams. Robert Evans wanted to cast his friend Alain Delon in a two-scene role as Lucky Luciano but this did not occur. The  role of Luciano was instead portrayed by Joe Dallesandro, starting the dramatic film career for the former Warhol Superstar.

Author Mario Puzo was the original screenwriter and was eventually replaced by William Kennedy, who wrote a rehearsal script in eight days which the cast used for three weeks prior to shooting. According to actor Gregory Hines, a three-hour film was shot during rehearsals. From July 15 to August 22, 1983, twelve scripts were produced, including five during one 48-hour non-stop weekend. Kennedy estimates that between 30 and 40 scripts were turned out. Production began on August 22, 1983, at Kaufman Astoria Studios in Queens. Over 600 people built sets, created costumes and arranged music at a reported $250,000 a day. During the production many crew members were abruptly fired. Within several weeks the film was already over budget, allowing Evans to deduct from the $4 million salary of Coppola, who had not yet been fully paid because the script was still being rewritten and thus incomplete. Coppola reacted by walking off set and refusing to continue directing the film until he was fully paid.

As costs on the film continued to rise, the Doumani brothers convinced Orion Pictures to advance costs for the film on the condition that Evans step down as producer and hired mobster Joseph Cusamano to intimidate Evans into giving up his share of the partnership. Evans initially agreed but stopped them by filing a restraining order against them after learning Sayyah was not involved in the deal. On June 7, 1984, Sayyah filed a lawsuit against the Doumani brothers, their lawyer David Hurwitz, Evans and Orion Pictures for fraud and breach of contract. Sayyah invested $5 million and said that he had little chance of recouping his money because the budget escalated from $25 to $58 million. He accused the Doumanis of forcing out Evans and said that an Orion loan to the film of $15 million unnecessarily increased the budget. Evans, in turn, sued Edward Doumani to keep from acting as general partner on the film. The court ruled in favor of Evans but also gave Coppola's close associate Barrie M. Osborne full control over post-production, essentially barring Evans from the completion of the film. Sayyah and the Doumani brothers would also be uncredited as producers.

Music
The soundtrack for the film was written by John Barry. It released on December 14, 1984, via Geffen Records. The album won the Grammy Award for Best Jazz Instrumental Performance, Big Band in 1986.

Release

Home media
Embassy Home Entertainment paid a record $4.7 million for North America home video rights.
The film appeared on videotape and videodisc in April 1985. It was the first to use the Macrovision copy protection system, on VHS and Betamax only.

Director's cut
In 2015, Coppola found an old Betamax video copy of his original cut that ran 25 minutes longer. When originally editing the picture, he acquiesced to distributors who wanted a shorter film with a different structure. Between 2015 and 2017, Coppola spent over $500,000 of his own money to restore the film to the original cut. This version, titled The Cotton Club: Encore and running 139 minutes, debuted at the Telluride Film Festival on September 1, 2017.  Lionsgate (owner of the Zoetrope Corporation backlog, and working in association with original studio Orion Pictures) released that version theatrically, and on DVD and Blu-ray in the fall of 2019.

The Film Stage gave The Cotton Club: Encore a rating of A−, while Rolling Stone described the result of this version as 'eye-opening'.

Reception

Box office
The Cotton Club was released on December 14, 1984, in the United States and Canada on 808 screens and grossed $2.9 million on its opening weekend, fifth place behind Beverly Hills Cop, Dune, City Heat and 2010. Evans took the blame for hiring Coppola while Coppola responded that if he had not been hired, the film would have never been made. Evans said that Coppola made the budget escalate dramatically by rejecting the script, hiring his own crew, and falling behind schedule. The film was a commercial failure, grossing just under $26 million against a $58 million budget. After the film's release stock traders began selling Orion Pictures shares with the expectation that the studio would suffer financially.

Critical response
On Rotten Tomatoes the film has a 77% rating  based on 30 reviews. The site's consensus states: "Energetic and brimming with memorable performers, The Cotton Club entertains with its visual and musical pizazz even as its plot only garners polite applause." On Metacritic the film has a weighted average score of 68% based on reviews from 14 critics.

Roger Ebert of the Chicago Sun-Times rated the film 4 out of 4. The film appeared on both Siskel and Ebert's best of 1984.

Conversely, Diane Lane was nominated for the Golden Raspberry Award for Worst Supporting Actress category (also for her work in Streets of Fire), ultimately losing to Lynn-Holly Johnson for Where the Boys Are '84.

References

Further reading

External links
 
 
 

1984 films
1980s musical films
1984 crime drama films
American crime drama films
1980s English-language films
Films about race and ethnicity
Films about the Irish Mob
Jazz films
Films directed by Francis Ford Coppola
Films with screenplays by Francis Ford Coppola
Films scored by John Barry (composer)
American Zoetrope films
Orion Pictures films
Films set in New York City
Films set in Harlem
Films set in the 1930s
Films produced by Robert Evans
Films about the American Mafia
Films about African-American organized crime
Films about Jewish-American organized crime
Cultural depictions of Lucky Luciano
Cultural depictions of Dutch Schultz
Cultural depictions of Cab Calloway
Films shot at Astoria Studios
1980s American films